Dischistodus is a genus of fish in the family Pomacentridae. It has seven described species.

Species
Dischistodus chrysopoecilus (Schlegel and Müller, 1839) - white-spot damsel
Dischistodus darwiniensis (Whitley, 1928) - banded damselfish
Dischistodus fasciatus (Cuvier in Cuvier and Valenciennes, 1830) - banded damsel
Dischistodus melanotus (Bleeker, 1858) - black-vent damsel
Dischistodus perspicillatus (Cuvier in Cuvier and Valenciennes, 1830) - white damsel
Dischistodus prosopotaenia (Bleeker, 1852) - honey-head damsel
Dischistodus pseudochrysopoecilus (G. R. Allen & D. R. Robertson, 1974) - monarch damsel

References

 
Pomacentrinae
Marine fish genera
Taxa named by Theodore Gill